George Edwin McNeill (1836–1906), was an American mill worker, labor leader, and writer from New England. McNeill is best remembered for a pioneering study of the American labor movement, The Labor Movement, or, the Problem of To-day, published in 1892.

Biography

Early years

George Edwin McNeill was born August 4, 1836, in Amesbury, Massachusetts. McNeill worked in various Amesbury textile mills from childhood, going to work in the Amesbury Woolen Company at the age of ten. This led McNeill to participation in an 1851 strike, when he was a boy of just 15. Strikers demanded a shortening of the working day to 10 hours at the mill, which the owner, the Salisbury Company, refused. When McNeill and the other workers abandoned their posts, mill owners terminated the employment of all, hiring a new crew of 50 Irish immigrants to operate the machinery of the facility.

Needing to find a new line of employment after termination in the strike, McNeill apprenticed as a shoemaker, learning that craft and moving to Boston in 1856.

Career

In Boston, McNeill became politically active and joined the Sons of Temperance, serving multiple times as an officer in that organization. He also became involved in the movement to institute the 8-hour day, co-founding the Grand Eight Hour League in Boston in 1863. This organization would change its name in 1868 to the Boston Eight Hour League. McNeill would serve as president of the Eight Hour League for eight years, taking part in that capacity in the successful lobbying of the state legislature for passage of a 10-hour day law in Massachusetts.

McNeill was the founder of the Working Men's Institute in Boston, and worked with abolitionist Wendell Phillips and Massachusetts Governor William Claflin to establish the Massachusetts Bureau of Statistics of Labor, the first labor bureau in the United States. Upon that body's formation he was named deputy chief by Governor Claflin.

McNeill became involved with the Sovereigns of Industry and was elected Massachusetts State Secretary of that organization. He was also involved in pioneer labor newspapers throughout the Northeastern United States, including the New York Labor Standard, the Fall River Labor Standard, and the Boston Voice, among others. He was also the founder of the Boston Labor Leader.

In 1874, McNeill served as a delegate to a labor congress in Rochester, New York, for which he wrote a declaration of principles which was later adopted by the Knights of Labor. He would himself join the Knights in 1883, assuming a prominent role in the leadership of District 30, the largest division of that organization. In 1884 he was elected Treasurer of District 30.

During this era there were few job safety rules and no provision for state workmen's compensation in the event of on the job accidents; insurance was frequently expensive and impossible for the working class to obtain. Consequently, in 1883 McNeill founded the Massachusetts Accident Company, designed to provide low cost insurance to factory workers in the state.

McNeill became directly involved in electoral politics in 1886, running as a labor candidate for Mayor of Boston.

McNeill studied the world of organized labor extensively and was the editor of and a contributor to the 1892 book, The Labor Movement, or, the Problem of To-day, regarded as one of the first comprehensive histories of the American labor movement.

A Christian socialist, McNeill was an active member of the Episcopal Christian Socialist Church of the Carpenter in Boston, becoming a senior warden of that body in 1891. He was a staunch Democrat in politics and was active in the 1896 Presidential campaign to elect William Jennings Bryan.

McNeill was also a poet of some renown and published a 1903 volume of his literary work.

Death and legacy

On May 17, 1906, McNeill was suddenly stricken by intestinal pain and was rushed to the hospital in Somerville, Massachusetts. An emergency operation was conducted, but McNeill was unable to survive the trauma, and he faded and died on May 19, 1906. McNeill was 69 years old at the time of his death.

Numerous leaders of the American labor movement were in attendance at his funeral, with the eulogy delivered by Samuel Gompers, President of the American Federation of Labor.

Footnotes

Works

 Factory Children: Report upon the Schooling and Hours of Labor of Children Employed in the Manufacturing and Mechanical Establishments of Massachusetts. Boston: Wright and Potter, 1875.
 Argument on the Hours of Labor, Delivered before the Labor Committee of the Massachusetts Legislature. New York: Labor Standard Publishing Co., n.d. [1870s].
 An Argument in Favor of a Legislative Enactment to Abolish the Tenement-House cigar factories in New York and Brooklyn. New York: n.p., 1882.
 The Labor Movement: The Problem of To-Day.  New York: M.W. Hazen Co., 1892.
 Evolution in the Boot and Shoe Industry. Boston: n.p., n.d. [1890s].
 A Study of Accidents and Accident Insurance. Boston: Insurance Topics Co., 1900.
 "The Democracy of Labor Organization," The Arena, vol. 1, whole no. 1, pp. 69–81.
 Unfrequented Paths: Songs of Nature, Labor and Men. Boston: J.H. West Co., 1903. —poetry
 The Eight Hour Primer: The Fact, Theory and the Argument: Questions to the Unemployed, the Employed, the Employer, the Capitalist, the Clergyman, and the Observer. Washington, DC: American Federation of Labor, 1907.

Further reading

 James R. Green and Hugh Carter Donahue, Boston's Workers: A Labor History. Boston: Trustees of the Boston Public Library, 1979.
 Janet McNeill Hively with Roger C. McNeill, Story of an American Reformer: George Edwin McNeill, 1837–1906. Gloucester, MA: R.C. McNeill, 2003.
 Tom Juravich, William F. Hartford, and James R. Green, Commonwealth of Toil: Chapters in the History of Massachusetts Workers and Their Unions. Amherst, MA: University of Massachusetts Press, 2000.

1836 births
1906 deaths
American Christian socialists
Trade unionists from Massachusetts
Massachusetts Democrats
People from Amesbury, Massachusetts
Activists from Boston
Knights of Labor people
Child labor in the United States
Sons of Temperance